Lake Kremasta is the largest artificial lake in Greece. The construction of Kremasta Dam was completed in 1965 concentrating waters from four rivers: Acheloos, Agrafiotis, Tavropos and Trikeriotis. It prevents flooding of the Acheloos, and supplies electricity to the national grid during peaks of demand. The power station at the dam is the biggest hydroelectric plant in Greece (rated power: 437.2 MW). It was constructed in 1966 and is owned by the Public Power Corporation of Greece (DEH A.E.). At the time of its construction, it was the largest earth-filled hydroelectric project in Europe.

The lake is located on the borders of Aetolia-Acarnania and Evrytania. There are two bridges over the lake (at Tatarna and Episkopi). The water of the lake penetrates along the beds of the rivers mentioned above, and forms a lot of fjords and small islands. The municipalities with shores on the lake are Agrinio and Amfilochia in Aetolia-Acarnania, and Agrafa and Karpenisi in Evrytania.

References

External links

Canoe-Kayak στην λίμνη
Natura 2000
limnikremaston.gr

Reservoirs in Greece
Landforms of Aetolia-Acarnania
Landforms of Evrytania